Elbio Raúl Lozza (October 27, 1911 – January 27, 2008) was an Argentinian painter, draughtsman, designer, journalist, and theorist who was part of the concrete art movement. He was part of the Asociación Arte Concreto-Invención. He was the founder of the Perceptivist group. He was granted the Platinum Konex Award  in Visual Arts from Argentina in 1992.

Early life and education 
Lozza was born in the town of Alberti in the Buenos Aires Province of Argentina, to parents Rafael Carlos Lozza, a designer, muralist, painter, paper-maker and musician, and Emma Lozza (née Righetti). Lozza's father had emigrated from the Lombardy region of Italy and his mother was the daughter of Italian immigrants. Lozza had two brothers: Rafael Obdulio Lozza and Rembrandt Van Dyck Lozza.

The family faced economic hardship after a tornado destroyed a theatre and other buildings Rafael Lozza had been working on. They continued to face economic hardship as Lozza's mother suffered from deteriorating mental health issues, which led to her being institutionalized in 1920, after which she escaped and disappeared. In 1923, Lozza's father committed suicide. Lozza and his brothers went to live with their maternal aunt, Amalia Righetti, and uncle, where they worked on their farm.

In 1925, Lozza left school. He did farm work during harvest time and worked as muleteer and bricklayer. Lozza began to work as a painter and paper-cutter, setting up a business with his brothers that gave them economic stability.

Career 
In 1929, the Lozza brothers moved to Buenos Aires to get further funding to study painting in Italy; however, the 1930 Argentine coup d'état made this impossible. During this time they studied theatre with José González Castillo and in December 1930 put on the play La sombra de la nada at the Teatro Roma de Alberti in collaboration with poet Vicente Barbieri and Juan Ferreyra Basso.

In 1932, after exhibiting paintings in a library in Almafuerte, in Flores and Alberti, as well as other venues, Lozza published an article called "A propósito del centenario de Goethe" in a periodical called La Zona. He also published poems and a play called Crepúsculos.

In 1933, Lozza, a member of the Communist Party at that time, was jailed for a month after protests of the treatment of political prisoners. During this period he became friends with Lino Enea Spilimbergo, Miguel Carlos Victorica, and the González Tuñón brothers: Raúl González Tuñón and Enrique González Tuñón. Lozza continued to be politically active, publishing illustrations and writings in the anti-fascist journal Socorro Rojo and La República.

In 1937, Lozza contracted tuberculosis, but continued to work. At this time, he works as a painter, title broker, lingerie cutter, fabric stamper, and artist in the field of advertising. Lozza eventually starts a lingerie business called Lingerie Femenil. As part of that business he designed lingerie for many famous women, including Delia Garcés.

Personal life 
In 1938, Lozza married his first wife, with whom he had a son, Arturo Lozza. After they divorced, in 1947 Lozza began a relationship with the painter Antonia Belizán, who he later married and had a son, Carlos Raúl Lozza.

Death 
On January 27, 2008, Lozza died of natural causes, at the age of 96, in the La Paternal, neighborhood of Buenos Aires in Argentina. He is buried at Cementerio de la Chacarita.

Selected exhibitions

Selected group exhibitions 
 1965: "Eugenio Abal, José Rodrigo Beloso, Raul Lozza. Paintings," Museu de Arte Moderna (Rio de Janeiro) [catalogue]
 1980: "Vanguardias de la década del 40. Arte Concreto-Invención, Arte Madí, Perceptismo," Museo de Artes Plásticas Eduardo Sívori (Buenos Aires)
 1989–1990: "Art in Latin America. The Modern Era, 1820–1980," The Hayward Gallery (London); Nationalmuseum / Moderna Museet (Stockholm); Palacio de Velázquez (Madrid)
 1990: "Argentina. Arte concreto-invención 1945, Grupo Madí 1946," Rachel Adler Gallery (New York)
 1992–1993: "Artistas latinoamericanos del siglo XX," Estación Plaza de Armas (Seville); Musée national d’art moderne, Centre national d’art et de culture Georges Pompidou (Paris); Josef-Haubrich-Kunsthalle (Cologne); The Museum of Modern Art (New York)
 1994–1995: "Art from Argentina 1920–1994," Museum of Modern Art (Oxford) [traveling exhibition]
 1997: "I Bienal de Artes Visuais do Mercosul" (Porto Alegre)
 2001: "Abstract Art from Río de la Plata. Buenos Aires and Montevideo, 1933–1953," The Americas Society (New York)
 2002: "50 años de pintura geométrica latinoamericana," Museo de Arte Contemporáneo Latinoamericano, La Plata (Buenos Aires)
 2003–2004: "Arte abstracto argentino," Galleria d’arte moderna e contemporanea (Bergamo); Fundación Proa (Buenos Aires)
 2006: "The Sites of Latin American Abstraction," Cisneros Fontanals Art Foundation (Miami, Florida) [traveling exhibition]
 2007: "The Geometry of Hope. Latin American Abstract Art from the Patricia Phelps de Cisneros Collection," Blanton Museum of Art, The University of Texas at Austin (Austin, Texas); Grey Art Gallery, New York University (New York)
 2009: "Geometric Abstract Works. The Latin American Vision from the 1950s, 60s and 70s," Henrique Faria Fine Art (New York)
 2010: "Then & Now. Abstraction in Latin American Art from 1950 to Present," 60 Wall Gallery, Deutsche Bank (New York)
 2010: "Vibración. Moderne Kunst aus Lateinamerika. The Ella Fontanals-Cisneros Collection," Bundeskunsthalle (Bonn)
 2010: "Realidad y Utopía - Argentiniens künstlerischer Weg in die Gegenwart," Akademie der Künste (Berlin)

Selected solo exhibitions 
 1949: Galería Van Riel (Buenos Aires)
 1963: Museu de Arte Moderna (Rio de Janeiro)
 1969: Instituto de Arte (Buenos Aires)
 1973: Galería Van Riel (Buenos Aires)
 1985: "Cuarenta años en el arte concreto (sesenta con la pintura)," Fundación San Telmo (Buenos Aires) [catalogue] 
 1993: Fundación Banco Patricios (Buenos Aires)
 1996: "Hermann Glöckner / Raúl Lozza, Batuz Foundation Sachsen," Altzella/Nossen (Dresden) [catalogue]
 1997: "Retrospectiva 1939–1997," Museo de Arte Moderno (Buenos Aires) [catalogue]
 2001: "Un museo por sesenta días. Selección de obra para un futuro museo de su pintura concreta," Centro Cultural Borges (Buenos Aires) [catalogue]
 2002: "Una revisión a la relación arte-ciencia en la obra de Raúl Lozza," Centro Cultural Borges (Buenos Aires) [catalogue]
 2006: Museo Nacional de Bellas Artes (Neuquén)

Selected works 
  (1946)
  (1948)

Works and publications 
  – Includes Raúl Lozza's manifesto on perceptismo and an essay by Abraham Haber
  – Catalog of an exhibition held at the Fundación San Telmo, Buenos Aires, 22 de Julio–18 de Agosto 1985
 
 
 
  – Catalog of an exhibition held at Centro Cultural Borges, De. 2001–Feb. 2002

References

Further reading 
 
  – 7 volumes
 
 
  – Biography by Lozza's son

External links 
 
 
 Raúl Lozza (artist file) at Museum of Modern Art
 
 Raúl Lozza at Museum of Fine Arts, Houston

Argentine painters
Argentine male painters
1911 births
2008 deaths
Concrete art